Novastorm is a rail shooter developed by Psygnosis in 1994. A version for the FM-Towns/Marty systems had previously been released under the name Scavenger 4.

Plot
The game takes place some time in the distant future. Humans have left earth in several huge arks containing Earth's ecosystem, in search of a new paradise. They have become complacent: everything is controlled by artificial intelligence, while the human race sleeps and dreams of its new home. The computer systems evolve, however, and prophesy of a conquest of silicon against flesh.

The player takes control of the Scavenger 4 squadron, which has a mission to destroy the deadly Scarab-X forces, in the last hope for the human race.

Gameplay
The gameplay is similar to many other FMV based games of the time. The player takes control of the Scavenger 4 spacecraft over 4 different environments. Each level ends with a boss fight, which the player must complete to proceed.

During the course of each level, the player gets attacked by groups (of about 2–5) of a particular enemy. Taking out every enemy in a particular group produces a token of bronze, silver or gold. These tokens are used like credits to obtain power-ups; upon picking one up, the power-up bar at the bottom of the screen moves along by differing amounts depending on the colour of the token. The power-ups are of increasing value to the player as the bar progresses. Pressing the select button gives the player the currently available power-up, and returns the bar to the bottom.

Version differences
The version released for the Sega CD has the addition of some 2D sprite mid-level enemies.

The PlayStation version is the only version of the game with full-screen FMV. It features a redesigned, minimalist HUD.

The DOS version released in 1994 in the U.S. features the original version of the soundtrack by Rik Ede with enhancements to the sound effects and voices. The rendering and level layouts are also significantly different from the console versions. Although only on one disc and the FMV is not full-screen, the video encoding and quality are comparable to the 2-disc PlayStation version. A secret level is also accessible by typing TOMATOES at the start of the game. Standard player fire turns to tomatoes and the player is warped to the final stage after the bonus level.

Reception

Scary Larry of GamePro gave the Sega CD version a mixed review, saying that the graphics are impressive despite the low resolution and lack of full color, but that the gameplay is overly easy and lacking in intensity, and that the game can easily be finished in a standard two-day rental. He reviewed that the 3DO version suffers the same problem. Electronic Gaming Monthly commented that the FMV is attractive but the gameplay is shallow and unenjoyable. They also criticized the game as being overly similar to Microcosm. A reviewer for Next Generation also found it far too similar to Microcosm, and added that "Microcosm was bad enough, but Novastorm doesn't even have the advantage of a knockout intro ..."

Reviewing the PlayStation version in GamePro, Air Hendrix shared Scary Larry's conclusion that the game has stunning graphics but crude and dull gameplay, though he found it too difficult rather than too easy. He summarized, "Despite the eye-catching fireworks, this game plays like a stale B grade shooter."

References

External links

http://www.psygnosis.org/games/novastorm
http://www.sega-mega-cd-library.co.uk/Game%20Pages/Novastorm.htm

1994 video games
3DO Interactive Multiplayer games
DOS games
FM Towns games
PlayStation (console) games
Psygnosis games
Sega CD games
Shoot 'em ups
Rail shooters
Full motion video based games
Single-player video games
Science fiction video games
Video games developed in the United Kingdom